Gyu Hyeong Cho is an electrical engineer at the Korea Advanced Institute of Science and Technology (KAIST) in Daejeon, South Korea.

Cho was named a Fellow of the Institute of Electrical and Electronics Engineers (IEEE) in 2016 for his contributions to power management circuit design.

References 

Fellow Members of the IEEE
Living people
South Korean engineers
Year of birth missing (living people)